Chasmodes longimaxilla, the stretchjaw blenny or longjaw blenny, is a species of combtooth blenny found in the western central Atlantic ocean.

References

longimaxilla
Fish of the Gulf of Mexico
stretchjaw blenny